Expiration or expiration date may refer to:

Expiration
Expiration may refer to:
Death
Exhalation of breath, breathing out
Expiration (options), the legal termination of an option to take an action
Shelf life, or the time after which a product expires
Timeout (computing), or the expiration of Session (computer science) due to the passing of time
Copyright expiration (disambiguation)
Expiration (film), a 2004 independent feature film

Expiration date

An expiration date is a predetermined date after which a particular product should no longer be used. The phrase may also refer to:
 Expiration Date (film), a 2006 comedy
 Expiration Date (Powers novel), a novel by Tim Powers
 Expiration Date (Swierczynski novel), written by Duane Swierczynski
 Expiration Date, an unaired pilot for a cut Team Fortress 2 television series that was then uploaded to YouTube

See also
 Maturation (disambiguation)